Capela Hill (Dealul Capela in Romanian) is a hill in the western part of the Romanian town of Râmnicu Vâlcea. Its name is most likely derived from a now-destroyed Catholic chapel built in the area during the Habsburg takeover of Oltenia (the "Banat of Craiova") in the first half of the 18th century. Part of the Southern Carpathians foothills, Capela Hill descends from an altitude of over 500 meters to the Olt River (at over 200 meters), creating a sloping valley on which most of the town of Râmnicu Vâlcea is built. The hill is partially developed into residential areas, but it also offers the town's main hiking and nature trails.

Geography of Vâlcea County
Hills of Romania